"Todavía Te Quiero" is a song recorded by Mexican singer Thalía, featuring American singer De La Ghetto, for her thirteenth studio album, Latina (2016). The song was released as the album's third single on December 2, 2016 through Sony Music Latin.

Live performance 
Thalía and De La Ghetto performed the song at the Premios Lo Nuestro 2017. The performance was considered one of the best from the night.

Music  video
The music video was released the same day as the song. The video is all cartoon animated and features Thalía working on a time travel gadget that her doggy snatches and travels to an unknown time to. Thalía goes back in time to rescue her dog and eventually he is returned to her by De La Ghetto. When she gets her dog back, she takes him with her back to the present and she is so happy that she doesn't realize that she altered the timeline. The video makes reference to much from Thalía's career, such as the dog being "Pulgoso" from her telenovela Marimar, a robot with a "sink bra" like the one she wore on her video for "Piel Morena", and even references the rumor that she had her ribs removed.

Charts

References 

Thalía songs
2016 songs
2016 singles
Sony Music Latin singles
Spanish-language songs
Song recordings produced by Sergio George
Songs written by Sergio George